HMS Boadicea was a  launched in 1875.
She served in the Zulu War between March–June 1879, and landed some of her men to join the naval brigade serving ashore; these took part in the battle of Gingindhlovu and the relief of Eshowe.

In 1881, she landed some of her crew to take part in the 1st Boer War or Transvaal War [Naval Brigade].

Robert Falcon Scott served on her early in his career.

She was struck off the effective list at Portsmouth and classified as a hulk in March 1900.

References

Publications

External links
 

 

Bacchante-class corvettes
1875 ships